John R. Quarles Jr. (April 26, 1935 – October 29, 2012) was an American attorney who served as the Deputy Administrator of the United States Environmental Protection Agency (EPA). 

Quarles graduated from Yale University and Harvard Law School. He joined the United States Department of the Interior in 1969 and assisted in the establishment of EPA in 1970. He later served as EPA's General Counsel, and Deputy Administrator from 1973 to 1977. He was later a partner and chairman of Morgan Lewis, a law firm in Washington, D.C. He retired from Morgan Lewis in 2006.

Quarles died of Alzheimer's disease on October 29, 2012, in Warrenton, Virginia at age 77.

References

1935 births
2012 deaths
Harvard Law School alumni
People of the United States Environmental Protection Agency
Yale University alumni